Buddy (March 23, 1988 – February 10, 1998) was a Golden Retriever dog actor. He was best known for playing the title role in the film Air Bud.

Early life 
Buddy was found by Kevin di Cicco as a stray dog in the Sierra Nevada in the summer of 1989. Di Cicco adopted the disheveled Golden Retriever and brought him home to San Diego, where he trained him in the sports of basketball, baseball, football, soccer, and hockey. Buddy's most eagerly awaited sport was basketball. He was touted as the Michael Jordan of dogs and the Scottie pippen too. Di Cicco revealed that Buddy tried to bite the ball, but its slipperiness, enhanced by saliva or more efficiently by olive oil, would propel it from his mouth.

Early appearances 
His first appearance was on America's Funniest Home Videos. He then gained further fame bouncing a basketball off his muzzle and into a basketball hoop on David Letterman's "Stupid Pet Tricks" segment of Late Night with David Letterman. Buddy appeared three times on Late Night and the Late Show with David Letterman.

Buddy took his skills to the NBA when he appeared during halftime at a Laker game on Christmas Day in 1991 where he had a better shooting percentage than three of the starting players of the opposing Clippers team. This opened up further opportunity to showcase his talents for game day entertainment at professional sporting events around the country.

Film 
He was cast as Buddy in the 1997 Disney film Air Bud, a film that tells the story of a golden retriever abandoned by his alcoholic abusive owner; in the film (which was Buddy's final acting role), he moved in with a boy named Josh Framm who was depressed after his father died in a plane crash.

He appeared on the Kids' Choice Awards in 1998, where he was nominated for a Blimp Award for the film. Prior to his death, Buddy sired nine puppies.

Illness and death 
In 1997, Buddy had his right hind leg amputated due to synovial cell sarcoma, a type of cancer that manifests near the joints, although he was still able to play basketball. Six months later Air Buddy died in his sleep due to complications from cancer on February 10, 1998, at his owner's San Diego home. At the time of his death, Buddy was 9 years old. Buddy was a month and 13 days away from celebrating his 10th birthday. Air Bud: Golden Receiver was dedicated to his memory.

Book 
Buddy's story is told in the 2012 book Go Buddy!, written by his owner Kevin di Cicco.

Awards and nominations

Films and TV

Film 
 Fluke - Fluke (1995) (uncredited)
 Air Bud - Buddy (1997)

Television 
 America's Funniest Home Videos - Himself (1992)
 Late Night with David Letterman - Himself (1992)
 Late Show with David Letterman - Himself (1994)
 Full House - Comet (1 episode) (1995)
 Nickelodeon Kids' Choice Awards - Himself (1995, 1998)

See also 
 List of individual dogs

References

External links 
 
 

1988 animal births
1998 animal deaths
Air Bud (series)
Dog actors
Deaths from synovial sarcoma
Animal deaths from cancer
Deaths from cancer in California
Neurological disease deaths in California